Podophorus is an extinct genus of plants in the grass family. The only known species is Podophorus bromoides, which was native to Robinson Crusoe Island in the South Pacific Ocean. This is one of the Juan Fernández Islands, part of the Republic of Chile. The plant was last collected in the wild in the mid-19th century and is now considered extinct. A genetic analysis of the type material found it to be most closely related to Megalachne, also endemic to the Juan Fernández archipelago. This clade was in turn found to be nested within a paraphyletic Festuca, most closely related to F. pampeana of South America.

References

Extinct flora of Oceania
Pooideae
Monotypic Poaceae genera
Flora of the Juan Fernández Islands
Plant extinctions since 1500
Robinson Crusoe Island